Witold "Vitek" Kiełtyka (24 January 1984 – 2 November 2007) was a Polish musician, best known as the drummer and percussionist for the technical death metal band Decapitated, and younger brother of the musician Wacław "Vogg" Kiełtyka. He had been with the band since its inception in 1996, when he was only twelve years old. He also worked with the death metal bands Dies Irae and Panzer X.  He used Pearl drums, Remo drumheads and Alchemy cymbals.

Death 

On 29 October 2007, while travelling to a show in Gomel, Belarus, the bus carrying Decapitated and Crionics was involved in an accident. The tour bus collided with a truck carrying wood, causing serious head injuries to both Kiełtyka and Adrian Kowanek.

The two were taken to a hospital in Novozybkov, Russia. While Kiełtyka's family released a statement saying that his condition had improved, he underwent trepanation and was due to be transported to a hospital in Kraków, Poland, for further treatment. However, Kiełtyka died on 2 November 2007 at the age of 23.

The Norwegian symphonic black metal band Dimmu Borgir played a tribute concert to him on 2 November 2007 at Oulu, Finland. The Polish band Virgin Snatch composed the song "It's Time" dedicated to the drummer.

Discography 
 (1997) Decapitated – Cemeteral Gardens (demo)
 (1998) Decapitated – The Eye of Horus (demo)
 (2000) Decapitated – Winds of Creation (Wicked World/Earache Records)
 (2000) Decapitated – The First Damned (Metal Mind Productions)
 (2002) Decapitated – Nihility (Earache Records)
 (2004) Decapitated – The Negation (Earache Records)
 (2006) Panzer X – Steel Fist (Metal Mind Productions)
 (2006) Decapitated – Organic Hallucinosis (Earache Records)

Posthumous releases
 (2008) Decapitated – Human's Dust (DVD)
 (2009) Dies Irae – The Art of an Endless Creation (DVD)

References 

 [ Decapitated] at Allmusic

External links 

 Decapitated official site

1984 births
2007 deaths
Decapitated (band) members
Polish heavy metal drummers
Male drummers
Death metal musicians
Polish musicians
Road incident deaths in Belarus
People from Krosno
20th-century male musicians